Poker Night in America (PNIA) is a poker television program which features cash games and sit & gos. The series production began in 2013 and was first aired in 2014. The show is web streamed and televised. PNIA was developed by Todd Anderson, president of Rush Street Productions and co-founder of the Heartland Poker Tour.

The show hosts various cash games at local casinos across the United States and is sponsored by 888poker. During the filming of the season one Shaun Deeb slow rolled Mike Matusow with quad 5s resulting in Matusow having an outburst. Since the incident, slow rolling has become a tradition on the show. Professional poker players such as Danielle Andersen, Maria Ho, Alec Torelli, Layne Flack, Phil Laak, Tom Schneider and others have appeared on the show.

In 2017, the show presented King of the Hill, a series of $50,000 buy in heads up sit & gos with players such as Daniel Cates, Phil Hellmuth, Doug Polk, Olivier Busquet, Dan Colman and Parker Talbot competing for a $200,000 prize.

Joe Stapleton and Chris Hanson were the commentators for the first 5 seasons. In 2018, PNIA intends to replace the current commentators with celebrities.

References

External links
 
 

Television shows about poker
Poker in Las Vegas
2014 American television series debuts